Diana McVeagh (born 6 September 1926, Ipoh) is a British author on classical music. She has written a biography of Gerald Finzi and several books on Edward Elgar. McVeagh studied at the Royal College of Music in the 1940s and was assistant editor with Andrew Porter at The Musical Times. Since 2013 the North American British Music Studies Association awards a biennial Diana McVeagh Prize for Best Book on British Music.

References

1926 births
Living people
British musicologists
Alumni of the Royal College of Music
British biographers